Sir Walter Robert Dempster Perkins, also known as Robert Perkins, (3 June 1903 – 8 December 1988) was a Conservative Party politician in England.

He was elected as Member of Parliament (MP) for Stroud in Gloucestershire at a by-election in May 1931, following the resignation of the Conservative MP Sir Frank Nelson.  He was re-elected at the general election in October 1931 and again in 1935.

However, he was defeated at the 1945 general election by the Labour Party candidate, Ben Parkin. At the 1950 general election he and Parkin both contested the new Stroud and Thornbury constituency, and Perkins took the seat with a majority of only 28 votes. The two men fought the seat again in 1951, when Perkins held the seat with a more comfortable majority of 1,582.

Perkins retired from the House of Commons at the 1955 general election, having been knighted in February 1954.

References

External links 
 Robert Perkins attends Post Office opening 1933
Vote for Bobby Perkins 1945 Stonehouse history Group
 

1903 births
1988 deaths
Conservative Party (UK) MPs for English constituencies
Knights Bachelor
Ministers in the Churchill wartime government, 1940–1945
UK MPs 1929–1931
UK MPs 1931–1935
UK MPs 1935–1945
UK MPs 1950–1951
UK MPs 1951–1955
Ministers in the Churchill caretaker government, 1945